is a passenger railway station located in the city of Miura, Kanagawa, Japan, operated by the private railway company Keikyū.

Lines
Misakiguchi Station is the southern terminus of the Keikyū Kurihama Line, and is located 13.4 km from the junction at Horinouchi Station, and 65.7 km from the northern terminus of the Keikyū Main Line at Shinagawa Station in Tokyo.

Station layout
The station consists of two dead-headed side platforms serving two bi-directional tracks. The station building is elevated and located above the tracks and platforms.

Platforms

History
Misakiguchi Station opened on 26 April 1975.

Keikyū introduced station numbering to its stations on 21 October 2010; Misakiguchi Station was assigned station number KK72.

Passenger statistics
In fiscal 2019, the station was used by an average of 16,683 passengers daily. 

The passenger figures for previous years are as shown below.

Surrounding area
 Keikyu New Town
Miura City Hall Hasse Branch Office
Miura City General Gymnasium (Shiokaze Arena)
 Kanagawa Prefectural Agricultural Research Institute Miura Proving Ground

See also
 List of railway stations in Japan

References

External links

 

Railway stations in Kanagawa Prefecture
Keikyū Kurihama Line
Railway stations in Japan opened in 1975
Miura, Kanagawa